Rebekah Mercer is an American heiress and Republican political donor who is the director of the Mercer Family Foundation. She began overseeing day-to-day operations of political projects for the Mercer family when the Mercers became involved in conservative causes. Her father, billionaire Robert Mercer, said in November 2017 that he had sold his stake in the news site Breitbart to his daughters. In August 2018, she funded and co-founded the social networking service Parler.

Early life and education
Mercer is the daughter of Diana Lynne (Dean) and billionaire hedge fund manager Robert Mercer; Rebekah is the second of the Mercers' three daughters. She was raised in Yorktown Heights, a suburb of New York. Mercer enrolled at Cornell before transferring to Stanford University where she studied biology and mathematics  and earned a master's degree in 1999 from Stanford in management science and engineering. She worked as a Wall Street trader at Renaissance Technologies, the hedge fund her father has helped lead. Mercer and her sisters also purchased Ruby et Violette, which sells cookies and brownies through its website.

Political activities
Mercer first became widely known in conservative circles in 2012 after Mitt Romney's defeat in the presidential election. She spoke to a group of wealthy conservative donors at New York's University Club about what the GOP had done wrong in canvassing and technology operations during the election cycle.

Mercer helped start Reclaim New York with Steve Bannon in 2013. The organization trains citizens to watch their government closely, and uses freedom of information laws to force the New York government to disclose public spending.

Mercer joined the board of the Heritage Foundation in 2014 as a trustee.

A September 2016 Politico headline called her "the most powerful woman in GOP politics." She has been more aligned with the anti-establishment part of the GOP than most other big Republican donors. Newsmax Media owner Christopher Ruddy called her the "First Lady of the Alt-Right".

Mercer supported Mitt Romney in 2012 and Ted Cruz for the 2016 presidential election. After Trump won the GOP nomination, she and her father switched their support to him. Mercer supported Jeff Sessions for Secretary of State over Mitt Romney.

2016 presidential election
Mercer, along with her father, contributed $25 million to the 2016 presidential election.

During the 2016 U.S. presidential primaries, Mercer led Keep the Promise I, a Super PAC (political action committee) which was the largest outside benefactor of Ted Cruz.

In June 2016 after Trump won the primary, Mercer created the Defeat Crooked Hillary PAC, and ran the daily operations. The PAC was incorporated with the name Make America Number 1 at the Federal Election Commission and supported Donald Trump in the general election including making anti-Clinton ads.

During the 2016 U.S. presidential election, Mercer proposed creating a searchable database for Hillary Clinton's e-mails in the public domain and then forwarded this suggestion to several people, including Cambridge Analytica CEO Alexander Nix, who e-mailed a request to Julian Assange for Clinton's emails. Assange responded to the report by saying he denied Nix's request. Mercer worked with Steve Bannon to create the film Clinton Cash. She has consulted extensively with former Democratic strategist and pollster Patrick Caddell on campaigns.

The Mercers stood behind Trump after the famous Access Hollywood tape was leaked in late 2016, dismissing Trump's claim of grabbing women's genitals against their will as "locker room braggadocio."

Donald Trump

Although initially a supporter of Ted Cruz in the 2016 presidential election, Mercer aimed her support at GOP candidate Donald Trump in June 2016 after Cruz lost the primary. Mercer directs the Mercer Family Foundation and served on the Executive Committee of the transition team of United States President-elect Donald Trump.

In the Trump transition, Mercer helped in successfully lobbying against Mitt Romney as secretary of state and for Sen. Jeff Sessions as attorney general. People close to the transition said she had not favored Corey Lewandowski as possible Republican National Committee chair and that Lewandowski had reportedly resisted paying for services from data firm Cambridge Analytica–a company funded by the Mercers–early in the campaign, though a close associate of Mercer's denied the stories. Paul Manafort, Kellyanne Conway's predecessor as campaign director, was also said to be critical of Cambridge Analytica, which had worked for Ted Cruz and was financially backed by the Mercers. Conway reportedly said that after the inauguration, the expectation was that Mercer was likely to lead an outside group, funded by her father, aimed at bolstering Trump's agenda. It was assumed that Cambridge Analytica would also assist the group's efforts.

In 2010, Mercer bought six adjoining apartment units in Donald Trump's 41-story Heritage at Trump Place.

Steve Bannon
The Mercers first introduced Steve Bannon to Trump. Mercer helped create the film Clinton Cash with Bannon, a top political adviser to Trump at the time. She has been one of Bannon's main financial contributors.

In late 2017, Bannon told several conservative donors that Mercer had pledged her financial support if he decided to run for president in 2020 against Trump. However, Mercer was frustrated by his comments to the media and disagreed with his public comments in support for Roy Moore, who was under fire for sexual misconduct allegations involving young girls. In January 2018 a person familiar with conversations between Mercer and Bannon said Mercer would no longer back Bannon financially. Mercer herself said that she had not spoken to Bannon, the former White House chief strategist, in many months and that she continued to support President Trump.

Breitbart News
Mercer and her father, Robert Mercer were key financial benefactors for Breitbart News. Larry Solov, the CEO of Breitbart, said in February 2017 that they are part-owners. Robert Mercer announced in November 2017 that he had sold his stake in the website to his daughters.

Cambridge Analytica

Cambridge Analytica was a privately held data mining and data analysis company with financial backing from the Mercers. The Mercers invested in the company after Mitt Romney lost the 2012 presidential election. On May 1, 2018, Cambridge Analytica and its parent company filed for insolvency proceedings and closed operations. Alexander Tayler, a former director for Cambridge Analytica, was appointed director of Emerdata on March 28, 2018. Rebekah Mercer, Jennifer Mercer, Alexander Nix and Johnson Chun Shun Ko who has links to Erik Prince are in leadership positions at Emerdata.

RAM Veterans Foundation 
In May 2022, Mercer was credited with creating the RAM Veterans Foundation, named in honor of Robert Alexander Mercer who died in France during World War II. RAM Veterans Foundation is an organization that reviews and recommends veterans charities to donors at CharitiesForVets.com.

Parler 
In 2018, Mercer co-founded, and funded, the social media website Parler with John Matze and Jared Thomson. Mercer described herself in a Parler post as having "started Parler" with Matze.
The Parler board, allegedly controlled by Mercer, fired Parler CEO John Matze on January 29, 2021.

As of early February 2021, Mercer holds the majority shares and, The Washington Post reported "increasingly pulls the strings" at Parler, controlling two-thirds of its board, and appointing other directors.

American Museum of Natural History 
The Mercer family has contributed $4 million to the American Museum of Natural History, and Rebekah Mercer sat on the museum board of directors from 2013 to 2019. In January 2018, a protest by the group Revolting Lesbians called for Mercer's removal from the board. The protest followed the release of a letter from over 200 academics and scientists calling for the board to "end ties to anti-science propagandists and funders of climate science misinformation."

Tax records indicate that the Mercer family donated millions of dollars to organizations that reject the scientific consensus regarding climate change. In March 2018 a group called the "Clean Money Project" mounted a spoof campaign aimed at highlighting Mercer's positions on climate change and pressuring the museum to sever ties with her.  In 2016, over 250 scientists penned an open letter calling for the museum to "end ties to anti-science propagandists and funders of climate science misinformation, and to have Rebekah Mercer leave the American Museum of Natural History Board of Trustees."

By the end of 2019 Mercer was no longer on the board.

Personal life
Mercer studied at Stanford University where she met Sylvain Mirochnikoff. The couple married in 2003. In 2010, she bought six adjoining apartment units in Donald Trump's 41-story Heritage at Trump Place. Mercer left her trading job to home-school her four children. In 2016, Mirochnikoff, a native of France, was a managing director at Morgan Stanley.

References

External links 
 

Conservatism in the United States
Living people
New York (state) Republicans
1973 births
People from Yorktown Heights, New York
Stanford University alumni
American stock traders
Women stock traders
Women in New York (state) politics
21st-century American women
Far-right politics in the United States